Sara Franceschi (born 1 February 1999) is an Italian swimmer. She competed in the women's 400 metre individual medley event at the 2016 Summer Olympics.  She competed at the 2020 Summer Olympics in 200 m individual medley and 400 m individual medley.

On day one of swimming competition at the 2022 Mediterranean Games, held in Oran, Algeria, Franceschi won the gold medal in the 400 metre individual medley with a time of 4:40.86. Three days later, she won her second gold medal of the Games, placing first in the 200 metre individual medley with a time of 2:12.19. The following month, at the 2022 European Aquatics Championships in Rome, she won the bronze medal in the 200 metre individual medley with a time of 2:11.38.

References

External links
 

1999 births
Living people
Olympic swimmers of Italy
Swimmers at the 2016 Summer Olympics
Sportspeople from Livorno
Italian female medley swimmers
Swimmers at the 2015 European Games
European Games competitors for Italy
Swimmers at the 2020 Summer Olympics
Swimmers at the 2022 Mediterranean Games
Mediterranean Games gold medalists for Italy
Mediterranean Games medalists in swimming
20th-century Italian women
21st-century Italian women
European Aquatics Championships medalists in swimming
Medalists at the FINA World Swimming Championships (25 m)